Xinjiang Province or Sinkiang Province was a province of the Republic of China. First set up as a province in 1884 by the Qing dynasty, it was replaced in 1955 by the Xinjiang Uygur Autonomous Region of the People's Republic of China. The original provincial government was relocated to Taipei as the Sinkiang Provincial Government Office (新疆省政府辦事處) until its dissolution in 1992.

Administration 
The province inherited the borders of the Qing dynasty province, bordering Kansu, Tsinghai, the Mongol Area, Tibet Area and the countries Soviet Union, Afghanistan, India and Pakistan. The claimed boundaries of the province included all of today's Xinjiang and parts of Mongolia, Tajikistan, Afghanistan and Pakistan.

History 

In 1912, the Qing dynasty was replaced by the Republic of China. Yuan Dahua, the last Qing governor of Xinjiang, fled. One of his subordinates, Yang Zengxin, took control of the province and acceded in name to the Republic of China in March of the same year. Through Machiavellian politics and clever balancing of mixed ethnic constituencies, Yang maintained control over Xinjiang until his assassination in 1928 after the Northern Expedition of the Kuomintang.

The Kumul Rebellion and other rebellions arose against his successor Jin Shuren in the early 1930s throughout Xinjiang, involving Uyghurs, other Turkic groups, and Hui (Muslim) Chinese. Jin drafted White Russians to crush the revolt. In the Kashgar region on November 12, 1933, the short-lived self-proclaimed First East Turkistan Republic was declared. The Hui Kuomintang 36th Division (National Revolutionary Army) destroyed the army of the First East Turkestan Republic at the Battle of Kashgar (1934), bringing the Republic to an end. The Soviet Union invaded the province in the Soviet Invasion of Xinjiang. In the Xinjiang War (1937), the entire province was brought under the control of northeast Manchu warlord Sheng Shicai, who ruled Xinjiang for the next decade with close support from the Soviet Union. In 1944, the President and Premier of China, Chiang Kai-shek, informed by the Soviets of Sheng's intention to join the Soviet Union, decided to shift him out of Xinjiang to Chongqing as the Minister of Agriculture and Forest. More than a decade of Sheng's era had ended. However, a short-lived Soviet-backed Second East Turkestan Republic was established in that year, which lasted until 1949 in what is now Ili Kazakh Autonomous Prefecture (Ili, Tarbagatay and Altay Districts) in northern Xinjiang.

During the Ili Rebellion the Soviet Union backed Uyghur separatists to form the Second East Turkistan Republic (2nd ETR) in Ili region while the majority of Xinjiang was under Republic of China Kuomintang control. The People's Liberation Army entered Xinjiang in 1949 and the Kuomintang commander Tao Zhiyue surrendered the province to them. The original provincial government was relocated to Taipei as the Sinkiang Provincial Government Office (新疆省政府辦事處) to symbolize the ROC's claim of sovereignty over the province; it was eventually dissolved in 1992.

Demographics

List of governors

Chairperson of the Provincial Government (Mainland era)

Xinjiang Provincial Government Office era

Chairperson of the Provincial Government

Director, Xinjiang Provincial Government Office

References 

Provinces of the Republic of China (1912–1949)
Xinjiang
Western China